Lee S. Shulman (born September 28, 1938) is an American educational psychologist and reformer. He has made notable contributions to the study of teaching, assessment of teaching, and the fields of medicine, science, and mathematics.

Background
Lee S. Shulman was born on September 28, 1938 in Chicago, Illinois. He was the only son of Jewish immigrants who owned a small delicatessen on the Northwest Side of Chicago. He attended a Yeshiva high school.

Shulman is a professor emeritus at Stanford Graduate School of Education, past president of the Carnegie Foundation for the Advancement of Teaching, past president of the American Educational Research Association, and the recipient of several awards recognizing his educational research. From 1963 to 1982, Shulman was a faculty member at Michigan State University, where he founded and co-directed the Institute for Research on Teaching (IRT).

Shulman is credited with popularizing the phrase "pedagogical content knowledge" (PCK). He was the 2006 recipient of the University of Louisville Grawemeyer Award in Education for his 2004 book, The Wisdom of Practice: Essays on Teaching, Learning and Learning to Teach.

Pedagogical content knowledge (PCK)
Shulman (1986) claimed that the emphases on teachers' subject matter knowledge and pedagogy were being treated as mutually exclusive. He believed that teacher education programs should combine the two knowledge fields. To address this dichotomy, he introduced the notion of pedagogical content knowledge that includes pedagogical knowledge and content knowledge, among other categories. His initial description of teacher knowledge included curriculum knowledge, and knowledge of educational contexts.

References

Further reading

Shulman, L. S. (1986). Those who understand: Knowledge growth in teaching. Educational Researcher, 15(2), 4-31.

External links
 Shulman's homepage

1938 births
Living people
Educational psychologists
Michigan State University faculty
Stanford University faculty
Jewish American social scientists
21st-century American Jews
American educational psychologists